Sarah "Sally" Tack Ryan (July 13, 1916 – June 29, 1968) was an American artist and sculptor best known for portrait style pieces and her association with the Garman Ryan Collection.

Sally Ryan was born in New York City, the daughter of Allan Aloysius Ryan (1880–1940) and Sarah Tack Ryan. She was the granddaughter of Thomas Fortune Ryan, a successful Irish-American entrepreneur. Allan A. Ryan, Jr. was her elder brother. Fortune Ryan had commissioned a portrait bust of himself by Rodin, now in the Tate collection in London. Sally Ryan's artistic career began in Canada in 1933, where she exhibited her first sculpture at the Royal Canadian Academy of Arts in Toronto. The following year she went on to study with the sculptor Jean Camus in Paris, where she achieved an 'honourable mention' at the annual Salon. She exhibited work at The Royal Academy of Arts in London in 1935. Ryan was an associate of poet Ralph Gustafson and sculptor Jacob Epstein. She was highly influenced by the latter's style.

In 1940, Ryan's work was included in Philadelphia's International Sculpture Exhibition, prior to her second one-man show in New York the following autumn.

Ryan used much of the inheritance she received from her grandfather to build a wide-ranging art collection alongside her life-long friend, Kathleen Garman. A number of her works are in the public collection of The New Art Gallery Walsall.

Ryan died of cancer of the throat (squamous cell epithelioma of larynx) in 1968. She died while at the Dorchester Hotel in London, England. She bequeathed her art collection to Kathleen  Garman and $50,000.

References

1916 births
1968 deaths
American people of Irish descent
American women sculptors
20th-century American sculptors
20th-century American women artists
Deaths from laryngeal cancer